Er-Rich is a town in Midelt Province, Drâa-Tafilalet Region, Morocco. Formerly part of Errachidia Province, it became part of Midelt Province in 2009.

The town originally developed around a ksar on a river bank of Oued Ziz on the plains between the mountains, and was an important fortress in previous times. On Mondays the souk is particularly busy. The town of Er-Rich once boasted a small church and a synagogue; the latter had been in use till the end of the sixties, when the Jewish community started leaving the town. The Jewish community had their own school adjacent to the town's elementary school. The rabbi made the daily trip to the local slaughter house to ensure the meat was kosher.

Attractions
Today, many people from the surrounding Ait Merghad, Ait Seghrouchen and other tribes have been flocking to Er-Rich in search of better economic opportunities. 

Er-Rich is a gateway to the town of Imilchil, near which the annual Bride Market takes place.

The Ksar where the notorious Tazmamart prison once stood is about 17 kilometers east of the town. 

The thermal springs of El Hammat, to which many Moroccan visitors flock on account of their health benefits, lie some 22 kilometers south east of the town. 

Errachidia Airport is approximately 65 kilometers south of Er-Rich. It presently serves the cities of Casablanca and Fez via Royal Air Maroc and Air Arabia Maroc respectively.

References

Populated places in Midelt Province